Tohir Sodiqov (sometimes spelled Tokhir Sodikov in English) (born July 1, 1973) is an Uzbek singer-songwriter and actor. He is best known as the long-time lead singer, guitarist, and songwriter of the Uzbek rock band Bolalar. Sodiqov has also established a successful solo career. He has recorded songs in Uzbek, Russian, and English.

Sodiqov has received dozens of awards and nominations, including the title Meritorious Artist of Uzbekistan. He is one of the few Central Asian artists to have given concerts in the US and to have released albums on iTunes.

Personal life
Tohir Sodiqov was born in Tashkent on July 1, 1973. His father, Sodiqov Bahromjon Sobirovich, was a retired officer and died when Sodiqov was a child. His mother, Sodiqova Gulnur Mansurovna, raised him as a single parent. Sodiqov attended Secondary School No. 41 in Tashkent from 1980 to 1990. He is married has three children, two daughters and a son.

Music career
Tohir Sodiqov had no formal music training. He started to play music when he was in high-school. Sodiqov and his friends Ruslan Sharipov, Bahodir Poʻlatov, and Javohir Zokirov, all of whom went to High School No. 41 in Tashkent, founded the band Bolalar in 1989.

Bolalar

Bolalar originally consisted of Bahodir Poʻlatov, Husan Sodiqov (Tohir Sodiqov's elder brother), Javohir Zokirov, Nargiza Zokirova, Ruslan Sharipov, Tofik Marduxayev, Toir Odilov, and Tohir Sodiqov. The band became widely popular in Uzbekistan with their song "Bolalar" in 1989.

Bolalar recorded their first album, Esingdami seni? (Do You Remember?), in January 1990. Initially, the group's artistic director and composer was Ruslan Sharipov. Over the years all of the original members left the band one after another. Currently, Tohir Sodiqov and Tofik Marduxayev are the only remaining original members.

Tohir Sodiqov usually writes both the music and lyrics to his songs. His music has been associated mostly with pop rock and experimental rock. The members of Bolalar were influenced by the Uzbek rock and roll singer Davron Gaipov and the then-popular Russian band Laskoviy Mai. Bolalar and Laskoviy Mai have often been called "the legends of the 1990s." Tohir Sodiqov and Yuri Shatunov, the lead singer of Laskoviy Mai, performed together in Tashkent in 2009.

Acting
Tohir Sodiqov has acted in half a dozen Uzbek films, most notably in Tohir va Zuhra: Yangi talqin (Tohir and Zuhra: A New Interpretation) (2000) and Koʻzlaring maʼyus (Your Eyes are Sad) (2005).

Filmography

Awards
Tohir Sodiqov has won dozens of awards and nominations, including the title Meritorious Artist of Uzbekistan. He has also received Nihol and Tarona awards. He is one of the few Central Asian artists to have given concerts in the US and to have released albums on iTunes.

References

External links

 Official website of Bolalar 

1973 births
Living people
Actors from Tashkent
Uzbekistani male film actors
21st-century Uzbekistani male singers
20th-century Uzbekistani male singers
Russian-language singers
English-language singers from Uzbekistan
Musicians from Tashkent